Twin Lights is an American soft drink company based in Rockport, Massachusetts, established in the early 1900s.  It is known for being one of the last small, independent soda pop bottlers in America, and for its popularity with soda aficionados and local residents.

History

The Thomas Wilson Bottling Company was established in Rockport, Massachusetts, in May 1907, by Thomas Wilson.  It began producing its trademark Twin Lights soda (or "tonic", as it is still sometimes referred to regionally) the same year.  The Twin Lights name and logo are taken from the twin lighthouses that sit at either end of Thatcher Island, located just off the coast of Rockport (notably, the lighthouses are America’s last and only operating twin lighthouses, and have been designated as a National Historic Landmark).

In the 1930s, more than 100 bottlers operated in Massachusetts, including brands like Chelmsford Ginger Ale, Millis’s Clicquot Club, and Polar Beverages.

Twin Lights’ heyday came during the 1950s and 1960s, when it produced tens of thousands of cases a year and rivaled both Coca-Cola and Pepsi in popularity within the region of Cape Ann, north of Boston.

The sodas became a part of local culture and were, at times, even attributed mythical qualities:  The local hospital used to serve Twin Lights ginger ale to patients, while Twin Lights orangeade gained a reputation as a reliable hangover cure.

Over time, many small bottlers were undercut by such factors as changing market demographics, the rise of national supermarkets and the introduction of nonreturnable packaging.  Likewise, the production of Twin Lights decreased over the decades, as well, but the business was kept alive.

Present

Today, Twin Lights is the only remaining independent bottler in their area.  Pierce Sears, great-grandson of founder Thomas Wilson, continues to operate the small business in the same original Rockport location, producing cases of Twin Lights soda on the family’s aging machinery, some of which dates back to pre-World War II.
 
The distribution of Twin Lights now is restricted mainly to local vendors in Rockport and Gloucester, Massachusetts, and to a handful of residential customers to whom Sears personally delivers the soda.

Current flavors include cola, orangeade, root beer, lemon-lime, grape, fruit punch, strawberry, cream soda, birch beer, sarsaparilla, golden ginger ale and pale dry ginger ale.

Recent newspaper articles have suggested that the business is in jeopardy, due to the rapidly decreasing availability of the 7-oz bottles required by the machines.  It is becoming increasingly difficult for Sears to locate the right sized bottles, leaving him reliant upon loyal customers to consistently return their bottles (most of which have become collectible, and can often be found on eBay selling for upwards of $20 apiece), and having to source similarly-sized old-fashioned bottles on the secondary market.

References

Further reading

 Clark, Edie (October 1998) Yankee Magazine "A Company of One - Pierce Sears and his Twin Lights Bottling Company"

American soft drinks
Drink companies of the United States
Companies based in Massachusetts
Food and drink companies based in Massachusetts